Our Family Honor is an American drama television series that aired on ABC from September 17, 1985, until January 3, 1986, as part of its 1985 fall lineup.

Launched as a two-hour TV-movie, Our Family Honor is about two New York City families who had known each other since their childhoods and who were involved in competing "family businesses" – the McKay family mostly worked for the New York City Police Department, where Patrick (Kenneth McMillan) was Commissioner, while the Danzigs were deeply involved in organized crime, with patriarch Vincent (Eli Wallach) filling the role of "godfather". Barbara Stuart played Vincent's wife, Marianne Danzig. Detective Sergeant Frank McKay (Tom Mason) was Patrick's often hot-headed son, while Vincent's cruel but inept son, Augie (Michael Madsen), was nonetheless his heir apparent. Liz McKay (Daphne Ashbrook), Patrick's niece, was a newly graduated officer now partnered with Officer Ed Santini (Ray Liotta).  She was romantically involved with Vincent's other son, Jerry (Michael Woods), who wanted out of his father's business and used the name "Jerry Cole" in order to minimize any connection with his father's family.  Another story line involved Vincent's murder of his wife's lover, carried out by Augie; when Frank came to arrest Augie for this crime, Augie died in the ensuing fight.  The effect of Augie's death was not revealed. Despite the program's large budget and large, impressive cast, it was cancelled due to low ratings after the episode (January 3, 1986) containing this event was aired.

Cast
Michael Madsen as Augie Danzig 
Daphne Ashbrook as Liz McKay 
Kenneth McMillan as Patrick McKay
Sheree J. Wilson as Rita Danzig
Michael Woods as Jerry Danzig 
Ray Liotta as Ed Santini 
Eli Wallach as Vincent Danzig 
Tom Mason as Frank McKay 
Barbara Stuart as Marianne Danzig
Ron Karabatsos as George Bennett

Episodes

References

Brooks, Tim and Marsh, Earle, The Complete Directory to Prime Time Network and Cable TV Shows

External links
 (pilot)
 (series)

American Broadcasting Company original programming
1980s American drama television series
Television shows set in New York City
1985 American television series debuts
1986 American television series endings
Television series by Lorimar Television